The 1980 Bank of Oklahoma Classic was a men's tennis tournament played on outdoor hard courts at the Shadow Mountain Racquet Club in Tulsa, Oklahoma in the United States that was part of the 1980 Volvo Grand Prix circuit. It was the third and last edition of the tournament was held from April 7 through April 12, 1980. Unseeded Howard Schoenfield won the singles title and earned $8,750 first-prize money.

Finals

Singles
 Howard Schoenfield defeated  Trey Waltke 5–7, 6–1, 6–0
 It was Schoenfield's only singles title of his career.

Doubles
 Bob Lutz /  Dick Stockton defeated  Francisco González /  Van Winitsky 2–6, 7–6, 6–2

References

External links
 ITF tournament edition details

Bank of Oklahoma Classic
Bank of Oklahoma Classic
Bank of Oklahoma Classic
Tennis in Oklahoma